Mortefontaine is a commune in the Oise department in northern France.

The castle of Mortefontaine was bought by Joseph Bonaparte, elder brother of Napoléon Bonaparte, in 1798. The Convention of 1800 (also known as the Treaty of Mortefontaine), a treaty of friendship between France and the United States of America was signed in the castle of Mortefontaine. The preliminaries of the 1802 Peace of Amiens were also negotiated at the castle.

See also
Communes of the Oise department

References

Communes of Oise